Robert Calvin Bland (born Robert Calvin Brooks; January 27, 1930 – June 23, 2013), known professionally as Bobby "Blue" Bland, was an American blues singer.

Bland developed a sound that mixed gospel with the blues and R&B. He was described as "among the great storytellers of blues and soul music... [who] created tempestuous arias of love, betrayal and resignation, set against roiling, dramatic orchestrations, and left the listener drained but awed." He was sometimes referred to as the "Lion of the Blues" and as the "Sinatra of the Blues". His music was also influenced by Nat King Cole.

Bland was inducted into the Blues Hall of Fame in 1981, the Rock and Roll Hall of Fame in 1992, and the Memphis Music Hall of Fame in 2012. He received the Grammy Lifetime Achievement Award in 1997. The Rock and Roll Hall of Fame described him as "second in stature only to B.B. King as a product of Memphis's Beale Street blues scene". In 2023, Rolling Stone ranked Bland at number 163 on its list of the 200 Greatest Singers of All Time.

Life and career

Early life
Bland was born Robert Calvin Brooks in the small town of Barretville, Tennessee. His father, I. J. Brooks, abandoned the family not long after Robert's birth. Robert later acquired the name "Bland" from his stepfather, Leroy Bridgeforth, who was also called Leroy Bland. Robert dropped out of school in third grade to work in the cotton fields and never graduated from school.

With his mother, Bland moved to Memphis in 1947, where he started singing with local gospel groups, including the Miniatures. Eager to expand his interests, he began frequenting the city's famous Beale Street, where he became associated with a circle of aspiring musicians, including B.B. King, Rosco Gordon, Junior Parker and Johnny Ace, who collectively were known as the Beale Streeters.

Early career
In 1951, talent scout Ike Turner recorded Bland for Modern Records at Tuff Green's house in Memphis. Because Bland was illiterate, they first recorded the one song he knew, "They Call It Stormy Monday." While the recording was never released, Bland later recorded the song in 1961, which became one of his hit singles. Turner backed Bland on piano for his first two records which were released under the name Robert Bland. Between 1951 and 1952, Bland recorded commercially unsuccessful singles for Modern and Sun Records (which licensed its recordings to Chess Records). However, these records caught the attention of Duke Records. Bland's recordings from the early 1950s show him striving for individuality, but his progress was halted for two years while he served in the U.S. Army, during which time he performed in a band with the singer Eddie Fisher.

When Bland returned to Memphis in 1954, several of his former associates, including Johnny Ace, were enjoying considerable success. He joined Ace's revue and returned to Duke Records, which was then being run by the Houston entrepreneur Don Robey. According to his biographer Charles Farley, "Robey handed Bobby a new contract, which Bobby could not read, and helped Bobby sign his name on it". The contract gave Bland just half a cent per record sold, instead of the industry standard of 2 cents.

Bland released his first single for Duke in 1955. In 1956 he began touring on the Chitlin' Circuit with Junior Parker in a revue called Blues Consolidated, initially doubling as Parker's valet and driver. He began recording for Duke with the bandleader Bill Harvey and the arranger Joe Scott, asserting his characteristic vocal style and, with Harvey and Scott, beginning to craft the melodic big-band blues singles for which he became famous, often accompanied by the guitarist Wayne Bennett. Unlike many blues musicians, Bland played no instrument.

Commercial success
Bland's first chart success came in 1957 with "Farther Up the Road", which reached number 1 on the R&B chart and number 43 on the Billboard Hot 100. It was followed by a series of hits on the R&B chart, including "Little Boy Blue" (1958). He also recorded an album with Parker, Blues Consolidated, in 1958. Bland's craft was most clearly heard on a series of early-1960s releases, including "Cry Cry Cry", "I Pity the Fool" (number 1 on the R&B chart in 1961) and "Turn On Your Love Light", which became a much-covered standard by many bands. Despite credits to the contrary—often claimed by Robey—many of these classic works were written by Joe Scott. Bland also recorded a hit version of T-Bone Walker's "Call It Stormy Monday (But Tuesday Is Just as Bad)", which was erroneously given the title of a different song, "Stormy Monday Blues".

His last record to reach number 1 on the R&B chart was "That's the Way Love Is", in 1963, but he continued to produce a consistent run of R&B chart entries through the mid-1960s. He barely broke into the mainstream market; his highest-charting song on the pop chart, "Ain't Nothing You Can Do", peaked at number 20 in 1964, in the same week in which the Beatles held down the top five spots. Bland's records mostly sold on the R&B market rather than achieving crossover success. He had 23 top ten hits on the Billboard R&B chart. In the book Top R&B/Hip-Hop Singles: 1942–1995, by Joel Whitburn, Bland was ranked number 13 of the all-time top-charting artists.

Later career

Financial pressures forced the singer to cut his touring band and in 1968 the group broke up. He suffered from depression and became increasingly dependent on alcohol, but he stopped drinking in 1971. His record company, Duke Records, was sold to the larger ABC Records group. This resulted in several successful and critically acclaimed contemporary blues and soul albums including His California Album and Dreamer, arranged by Michael Omartian and produced by ABC staffer Steve Barri. The albums, including the later "follow-up" in 1977, Reflections in Blue, were recorded in Los Angeles and featured many of the city's top session musicians at the time.

The first single released from His California Album, "This Time I'm Gone for Good" took Bland back into the pop Top 50 for the first time since 1964 and made the R&B top 10 in late 1973. The opening track from Dreamer, "Ain't No Love in the Heart of the City", was a strong R&B hit. A version of it was released in 1978 by the hard-rock band Whitesnake, featuring the singer David Coverdale. Much later it was sampled by Kanye West on Jay-Z's hip-hop album The Blueprint (2001). The song is also featured on the soundtrack of the crime drama The Lincoln Lawyer (2011), starring Matthew McConaughey. The follow-up, "I Wouldn't Treat a Dog" was his biggest R&B hit for some years, climbing to number 3 in late 1974, but as usual his strength was never the pop chart (on which it reached number 88). Subsequent attempts at adding a disco flavor were mostly unsuccessful. A return to his roots in 1980 for a tribute album to his mentor Joe Scott, produced by music veterans Monk Higgins and Al Bell, resulted in the album Sweet Vibrations, but it failed to sell well outside of his traditional "chitlin circuit" base.

In 1985, Bland signed a contract with Malaco Records, specialists in traditional Southern black music, for which he made a series of albums while continuing to tour and appear at concerts with B. B. King. The two had collaborated on two albums in the 1970s. Despite occasional age-related ill health, Bland continued to record new albums for Malaco and perform occasional tours alone, with the guitarist and producer Angelo Earl and also with B. B. King, and performed at blues and soul festivals worldwide. In 1985, the album Members Only on Malaco reached number 45 on Billboard's R&B albums chart, and the title song reached number 54 for R&B singles. It was his last chart single, and became Bland's signature song for the rest of his career. Bland was inducted into the Rock and Roll Hall of Fame in 1992. The Rock and Roll Hall of Fame described him as "second in stature only to B. B. King as a product of Memphis's Beale Street blues scene".

Collaborations and tributes
The Irish singer-songwriter Van Morrison was an early adherent of Bland, covering "Turn On Your Love Light" while with the band Them (he later covered "Ain't Nothing You Can't Do" on his 1974 live album It's Too Late to Stop Now), and Bland was an occasional guest singer at Morrison's concerts. He also included a previously unreleased version of a March 2000 duet of Morrison and Bland singing "Tupelo Honey" on his 2007 compilation album, The Best of Van Morrison Volume 3.

In 2008 the British singer and lead vocalist of Simply Red, Mick Hucknall, released the album Tribute to Bobby, containing songs associated with Bland. The album reached 18 in the UK Albums Chart.

Death 
Bland continued performing until shortly before his death. He died on June 23, 2013, at his home in Germantown, Tennessee, a suburb of Memphis, after what family members described as "an ongoing illness." He was 83. He is interred at Memorial Park Cemetery in Memphis. He is survived by his wife, Willie Martin Bland, and his son Rodd, who is also a musician. After his death, his son Rodd told news media that Bland had recently told him that the blues musician James Cotton was Bland's half-brother.

Accolades 
Bland was nominated for seven Grammy Awards in the course of his career.

He received the following honors:

Blues Hall of Fame - inducted 1981
Rhythm and Blues Pioneer Award - 1992
Rock and Roll Hall of Fame - inducted 1992
Grammy Lifetime Achievement Award - 1997
Rhythm & Blues Foundation Lifetime Achievement Award - 1998
Grammy Hall of Fame - "Turn On Your Love Light" (1999)
Memphis Music Hall of Fame - inducted 2012
National Rhythm & Blues Hall of Fame - inducted 2021

Discography

Studio albums

Live albums

Collaborative album
Blues Consolidated, 1958 (Duke Records) (with Junior Parker)

Compilations
The Best of Bobby Bland, 1967 (Duke Records)
The Best of Bobby Bland, vol. 2, 1968 (Duke Records)
First Class Blues, 1987 (Malaco Records)
The "3B" Blues Boy: The Blues Years 1952-1959, 1991 (Ace Records)
I Pity the Fool: The Duke Recordings, vol. 1, 1992 (MCA)
Turn on Your Love Light: The Duke Recordings, vol. 2, 1994 (MCA)
That Did It!: The Duke Recordings, vol. 3, 1996 (MCA)
Greatest Hits, Vol. 1: The Duke Recordings, 1998 (MCA, Duke/Peacock)
Greatest Hits, Vol. 2: The ABC–Dunhill/MCA Recordings, 1998 (MCA)
The Anthology, 2001 (MCA)
Unmatched: The Very Best of Bobby Bland, 2011 (Malaco)
Angel in Anguish: The Deep, Deep Soul of Bobby Blue Bland, 2013 (Fingertips)

Singles

References

External links

Bobby Bland discography
Bobby Bland at Wenig-Lamonica Associates
Bobby Blue Bland at AuthenticBlues.com

1930 births
2013 deaths
20th-century African-American male singers
American blues singers
American soul singers
Duke Records artists
Dunhill Records artists
Electric blues musicians
Grammy Lifetime Achievement Award winners
Modern Records artists
Kent Records artists
Malaco Records artists
Northern soul musicians
People from Germantown, Tennessee
Soul-blues musicians
United States Army soldiers
Burials at Memorial Park Cemetery (Memphis, Tennessee)